The 1978 Big League World Series took place from August 12–19 in Fort Lauderdale, Florida, United States. Taipei, Taiwan defeated Tampa, Florida in the championship game. It was Taiwan's fifth straight championship.

This year featured the debut of the Venezuela region.

Teams

Results

References

Big League World Series
Big League World Series